Red Mask: A Story of the Early Victorian Goldfields is an Australian historical novel by E. V. Timms, set at the time of the Victorian gold rush.

References

External links
Red Mask at AustLit
Serialised in World News in 1926-27 – 18 Dec,  5 Feb, 12 Feb, 19 Feb, 5 March, 26 March, 2 April, 16 April

1927 Australian novels
Australian historical novels
Novels set in Victoria (Australia)
Novels set in the 1850s
Novels first published in serial form